Andrea Bonaventura (born March 11, 1986) is a professional Canadian football linebacker. He was drafted by the Edmonton Eskimos in the third round of the 2009 CFL Draft. He played CIS football for the Calgary Dinos, where he was named All-Canadian and was nominated for the Defensive Player of the Year. He is currently playing for the STU Northside Bulls of the Superserien in Sweden.

References

External links
 Calgary Dinos bio

1986 births
Living people
Sportspeople from Hamilton, Ontario
Players of Canadian football from Ontario
Canadian football linebackers
Saint Mary's Huskies football players
Calgary Dinos football players
Edmonton Elks players